was the 14th daimyō of Fukui Domain under the Edo period Tokugawa shogunate in Echizen Province.

Naritsugu was born in Fukui as the third son of Matsudaira Haruyoshi. His childhood name was Jinosuke (仁之助). In 1817, he was engaged to Asahime, a daughter of Shōgun Tokugawa Ienari, and the couple was formally married in 1819.

He underwent his genpuku ceremony in 1824 and received a kanji from Tokugawa Ienari’s name to become Matsudaira Naritsugu. At that time, his courtesy title was Iyo-no-kami and his court rank  was Junior Fourth Rank, Upper Grade.

His father died in 1825 and he formally became daimyō of Fukui early the following year. His courtesy title became Echizen-no-kami and also Sakon'e-no-shōjō

Early in his tenure (from 1827) he ordered a five-year fiscal austerity plan in an attempt to rebuild the domain’s finances, and from 1829 he ordered that the domain’s retainers be reduced to half the present number over the next seven years. However, in stark contrast to these efforts, he maintained the luxurious lifestyle of his father and grandfather, and spared no expense when he rebuilt the palace within the grounds of Fukui Castle. The domain was also hit hard by increasing rice prices, and a major smallpox epidemic.

Naritsugu also attempted to convince the Shōgun to allow him to trade territories with Hikone Domain under the control of the Ii clan; however, he died in 1835 at the domain’s Edo residence at the age of 25, possibly due to illness, before a decision was reached. This was one of the causes of the ill-will between the Tairō Ii Naosuke and future daimyō of Fukui, especially Matsudaira Shungaku.

At the time of his death, Naritsugu had not yet produced an heir. A younger son of Tokugawa Ienari, and thus a brother of Asahime, was chosen as successor.

External links
 "Fukui" at Edo 300 
  越前松平氏 (Echizen Matsudaira) at ReichsArchiv.jp

Notes

1811 births
1835 deaths
Shinpan daimyo
Fukui-Matsudaira clan
People of Edo-period Japan